Accra erythrocyma is a species of moth of the family Tortricidae.

Location
It is found in Cameroon.

References

Endemic fauna of Cameroon
Moths described in 1930
Tortricini
Moths of Africa